Shin Myat Hla was Duchess of Pakhan from 1426 to . She was the only sister of King Mohnyin Thado (r. 1426–1439), and the mother of Queen Min Hla Nyet of Ava. She had the same name as her sister-in-law Queen Shin Myat Hla of Ava.

Ancestry
Shin Myat Hla was descended from the Pinya and ultimately Pagan royal lines.

Notes

References

Bibliography
 
 
 

Ava dynasty
15th-century Burmese women